Brenda Buell Vaccaro (born November 18, 1939) is an American stage, television, and film actress. In a career spanning over half a century, she received one Academy Award nomination, three Golden Globe Award nominations (winning one), four Primetime Emmy Award nominations (winning one), and three Tony Award nominations.

Early life
Vaccaro was born in Brooklyn, New York, to Italian-American parents Christine M. and Mario A. Vaccaro, a restaurateur. She was raised in Dallas, Texas, where her parents, in 1943, founded Mario's Restaurant, and where she graduated from Thomas Jefferson High School.

At 17, she returned to New York City to study acting under the guidance of Sanford Meisner at the Neighborhood Playhouse, and made her Broadway debut in the short-lived 1961 comedy Everybody Loves Opal, for which she won a Theatre World Award.

Career
Vaccaro's Broadway credits include The Affair (1962), Cactus Flower (1965), the musical How Now, Dow Jones (1967), The Goodbye People (1968), the female version of The Odd Couple (1985), and Jake's Women (1992). The husky-voiced actress is a three-time Tony Award nominee, for Best Featured Actress in a Play (Cactus Flower), Best Actress in a Musical (Dow Jones), and Best Actress in a Play (The Goodbye People). She was featured on the May 29, 1970 cover of Life magazine.

Vaccaro appeared with Dustin Hoffman and Jon Voight in the 1969 film Midnight Cowboy, for which she was nominated for a Golden Globe Award for Best Supporting Actress. She played Ethel Rosenberg in Stanley Kramer's Judgment: The Trial of Julius and Ethel Rosenberg in 1974, and for her performance in the 1975 film adaptation of Jacqueline Susann's Once Is Not Enough, she gained an Academy Award nomination and won the Golden Globe for Best Supporting Actress.

Additional screen credits include Airport '77; Capricorn One; The Pride of Jesse Hallam, Supergirl; The Mirror Has Two Faces; Heart of Midnight; Zorro, The Gay Blade; and House by the Lake, also known as Death Weekend.

Her television credits include the title role in the 1976 series Sara, a number of television movies, and a regular role in the short-lived 1984 series Paper Dolls, in addition to guest appearances on Banacek, The Fugitive, The Defenders, Coronet Blue, The Name of the Game, Marcus Welby, M.D., McCloud, The Streets of San Francisco, The Love Boat, St. Elsewhere, Murder, She Wrote, The Golden Girls, Columbo, Touched by an Angel, Friends (as the mother of Matt LeBlanc's "Joey"), The King of Queens, and Nip/Tuck. She was nominated for an Emmy Award three times and won for Best Supporting Actress in Comedy-Variety, Variety or Music for The Shape of Things in 1974.

Vaccaro was lampooned by Andrea Martin on SCTV for a groundbreaking 1980 commercial appearance for feminine hygiene products.

She supplied the voice for Johnny Bravo'''s mother Bunny Bravo in the animated cartoon series. She was the first voice of Jay's (Jon Lovitz)'s ex-wife Ardeth on The Critic. She made an appearance on The Smurfs as Scruple, an apprentice of Gargamel, opposite Paul Winchell.

After ill health forced Valerie Harper to bow out of the production of Nice Work If You Can Get It at the Ogunquit Playhouse (Maine), Vaccaro took over the role of Millicent Winter for the remaining performances of the limited run from August 4–15, 2015.

She played Al Pacino's sister in You Don't Know Jack (2010). She currently plays Gloria Marquette in the Sex and the City reboot, And Just Like That... Personal life 
She entered a nearly seven-year relationship with Summertree co-star Michael Douglas in 1971. She guest-starred in two episodes of The Streets of San Francisco, the TV crime drama in which Douglas co-starred from 1972 to 1977.

She has been friends with Barbra Streisand since they both appeared on Broadway in the early 1960s. Streisand directed her in The Mirror Has Two Faces''.

Filmography

Film

Television

Stage

References

External links

1939 births
20th-century American actresses
21st-century American actresses
Actresses from Dallas
American people of Italian descent
American film actresses
American stage actresses
American television actresses
American voice actresses
Best Supporting Actress Golden Globe (film) winners
Living people
Neighborhood Playhouse School of the Theatre alumni
People from Brooklyn
Primetime Emmy Award winners
Thomas Jefferson High School (Dallas) alumni